Stari Dvor (or Staridwor) is a former settlement in the Municipality of Škofja Loka in the Upper Carniola region of Slovenia. It now corresponds to the neighborhood of Stari Dvor in Škofja Loka.

Name
The name Stari Dvor literally means 'old manor'. Dvor is a relatively common toponym in Slovenia and, in addition to 'manor', may also refer to a farm with outbuildings, an estate, a (fenced-in) courtyard, or a barnyard, as well as a medieval agricultural estate comprising up to 40 farms. The name refers to a manor belonging to the Dominion of Loka that stood in the area in the 11th century. No trace of the manor remains today. In the 19th century the German name was Stariduor or Staridwor.

History
The population of the village grew rapidly in the late 19th century, with a 60% increase from 1869 to 1880, due to the railroad station established in 1870. After the Second World War, a refrigerator factory was established in Stari Dvor in 1946.  A prewar sawmill and wartime military base were converted to a wood processing plant, along with a technical school for wood processing, in 1948. By 1961, the population of Stari Dvor was nearly 10 times greater than it had been a century earlier because of the industries attracted by the railroad. Stari Dvor was annexed by the town of Škofja Loka in 1970, ending its existence as a separate settlement.

Notable people
Notable people that were born or lived in Stari Dvor include:
Slavko Prevec (1906–1944), physician

References

External links
Stari Dvor on Geopedia

Populated places in the City Municipality of Kranj